Behula is a mythological Bengali television serial which was broadcast on GEC Star Jalsha in 2010, weekdays at 9:30pm . It  starred Payel Dey, Arka Majumdar, Rimjhim Mitra, Chandrayee Ghosh, Kaushik Chakraborty and Rupanjana Mitra, produced by Shree Venkatesh Films, it is based on the story of Behula and Lakhindar. It has been aired on Star Vijay as a dubbed Tamil show Mangayin Sabatham and on Sahara One as a dubbed Hindi show under the same name. This serial has also been dubbed in Assamese language as Soti Beula and aired on Focus Hifi. It was re-aired on Star Jalsha during lockdown period, due to COVID-19.

Plot 

The show was adapted from the Hindu mythological story of Manasamangal Kāvya and Behula.

The story of Manasamangal begins with the conflict of the merchant Chandradhar or Chand Sadagar with Manasa and ends with Chandradhar becoming an ardent devotee of Manasa. Chandradhar is a worshipper of Shiva, but Manasa hopes that she can win over Chand to her worship. But, far from worshipping her, Chand refuses to even recognize her as a deity. Manasa takes revenge upon Chand by destroying seven of his ships at sea and killing his seven sons. Finally, Behula, the newly-wed wife of Chand's youngest son Lakhindar, makes the goddess bow to her love for her husband through her strength of character, limitless courage and deep devotion. Behula succeeds in bringing Chand's seven sons back to life and rescuing their ships. Then only does Behula return home. Manasamangal is the tale of oppressed humanity. Chandradhar and Behula have been portrayed as two strong and determined characters at a time when ordinary human beings were subjugated and humiliated. The epic brings out the caste divisions and the conflicts between Aryans and non-Aryans. The conflict between human beings and the goddess brings out the social discrimination of society, as well as the conflict between Aryans and non-Aryans. Shiva, whom Chand worshipped, was originally not an Aryan god, but over time was elevated to that position. Manasa's victory over Chand suggests the victory of the indigenous or non-Aryan deity over the Aryan god. However, even Manasa is defeated by Behula. The poem thus suggests not only the victory of the non-Aryan deity over the Aryan god, but also the victory of the human spirit over the powerful goddess. Manasamangal is also remarkable for its portrayal of Behula who epitomises the best in Indian womanhood, especially the Bengali woman's devotion to her husband.

Cast 
 Payel De as Behula/Usha
 Arkajyoti Paul Chaudhury as Lakhindar/Aniruddha
 Rimjhim Mitra / Chandrayee Ghosh as Manasha
 Kaushik Chakraborty as Chand Sadagar
 Swaswati Guha Thakurata as Chand Sadagar's mother
 Suchismita Chowdhury as Neeti Dhopani
 Rupanjana Mitra as Sanaka
 June Malia as Parvati
 Kushal Chakraborty as Shiva
 Kamalika Banerjee / Locket Chatterjee / Subhadra Chakraborty as Sumitra: Behula's mother
 Soma Dey as Behula's grandmother 
 Debdut Ghosh as Saha Bene, Behula's father
 Nayana Banerjee 
 Arpita Mukherjee

Production 
The show was produced by Shree Venkatesh Films. It was relaunched again in 2013 on Jalsha Movies along with Bou Kotha Kao. The show generated a TRP of 13.0 which was a record for Kolkata television.

References

External links
 
 Website

Indian epic television series
Star Jalsha original programming
2010 Indian television series debuts
2011 Indian television series endings
Bengali-language television programming in India